Kabul is the capital city of Afghanistan. 

Kabul may also refer to:

Afghanistan
 Kabul Subah, a top-level province of the Mughal empire, roughly covering its part of Afghanistan (and Kashmir until that was split-off)
 Kabul Province, the province of modern Afghanistan where the capital city of Kabul is situated
 Kabul River, the main river in the eastern part of Afghanistan

Israel
 Kabul, Israel, a local council in the North District of Israel
 Cabul, the biblical city thought to be in the vicinity of the modern town

See also 
 Kabolabad, a village in Iran